Magnus Stifter (23 January 1878 – 8 September 1943) was an Austrian stage and film actor. He appeared in 85 films between 1914 and 1941. He was born in Vienna, Austria-Hungary (now Austria), and died in Vienna, Austria.

Selected filmography

 The ABC of Love (1916)
 Your Dearest Enemy (1916)
 When the Heart Burns with Hate (1917)
 Carmen (1918)
 Between Two Worlds (1919)
 The Woman at the Crossroads (1919)
 State Attorney Jordan (1919)
 Out of the Depths (1919)
 Prince Cuckoo (1919)
 Veritas Vincit (1919)
 The Duty to Live (1919)
 The Devil and the Madonna (1919)
 Countess Walewska (1920)
 Der Januskopf (1920)
 Die Frau im Delphin (1920)
 The Lady in Black (1920)
 The Conspiracy in Genoa (1921)
 At War in the Diamond Fields (1921)
 The Handicap of Love (1921)
 The Bull of Olivera (1921)
 The Secret of the Mummy (1921)
 The Adventuress of Monte Carlo (1921)
 The Earl of Essex (1922)
 Der brennende Acker (1922)
 Othello (1922)
 The Man of Steel (1922)
  The Queen of Whitechapel  (1922)
 Yvette, the Fashion Princesss (1922)
 Irene of Gold (1923)
 Mister Radio (1924)
 Orient (1924)
 Spring Awakening (1924)
 Za La Mort (1924)
 Nelly, the Bride Without a Husband (1924)
 Wallenstein (1925)
 Nameless Woman (1927)
 The Story of a Little Parisian (1928)
 Fair Game (1928)
  Tales from the Vienna Woods (1928)
 Napoleon at Saint Helena (1929)
 Roses Bloom on the Moorland (1929)
 Misled Youth  (1929)
 Latin Quarter (1929)
 The Case of Colonel Redl (1931)
 Elisabeth of Austria (1931)
 Rasputin, Demon with Women (1932)
 Maria Ilona (1939)
 Friedemann Bach (1941)

References

External links

1878 births
1943 deaths
Austrian male stage actors
Austrian male film actors
Austrian male silent film actors
20th-century Austrian male actors
Male actors from the Austro-Hungarian Empire